The Lauxaniidae are a family of acalyptrate flies. They generally are small flies (length 7 mm or less) with large compound eyes that often are brightly coloured in life, sometimes with characteristic horizontal stripes, such as in Cestrotus species. Many species have variegated patterns on their wings, but in contrast they generally do not have variegated bodies, except for genera such as Cestrotus, whose camouflage mimics lichens or the texture of granitic rocks.

Some 1800 species of Lauxaniidae have been described and they comprise some 126 genera. The family has a cosmopolitan distribution, most of the species occurring in tropical regions of Asia and the Americas; relatively few species occur in Afrotropical regions, and Lauxaniid species diversity declines strongly towards the more temperate regions; for example fewer than 200 European species have been described. Most species inhabit forests, where the adults usually are found sitting on leaves of the understory. They are far less common in open country, such as grassland habitats.

Description
For terms, see Morphology of Diptera
Lauxaniidae are small flies (2–7 mm in length). They are often rather plump, dull, or partly lustrous flies. The body colour varies from yellow to brown or black, or with a combination of these colours. The head is variable in shape, the face projecting or retreating, convex, flat or concave, usually without oral vibrissae (sometimes poorly developed, occasionally strong bristles near the vibrissal angle). The postvertical bristles converge (in rare cases parallel).  The frons is wide, with two pairs of frontal bristles, the upper pair of which is always reclinate, the lower pair sometimes decussate. Interfrontal bristles are absent. The ocellar bristles are present or minute. The antennae are variable and the arista is plumose,  pubescent to bare. The thorax has bristles, at least behind the suture. The scutellum is usually bare except for the marginal bristles. Propleural bristles are present or absent and one or two sternopleural bristles are seen. Tibiae all have a preapical bristle. The wings are marked or unmarked (in a number of species with spots along the veins). The wing venation is complete and the costa is continuous. The subcosta is entire and ends in the costa. The second basal and anal cells are short and the apical cell usually widely open. The abdomen is oval, rarely elongated.

Biology

The larvae are mostly saprophagous, feeding in leaf litter, soil, bird nests, etc. Larvae of some mine fallen leaves, others live in rotten wood, and some cause deformation of the flowers and pistils of violets.

Genera

Afrominettia Stuckenberg, 1971
Agriphoneura Hendel, 1925
Allogriphoneura Hendel, 1926
Allominettia Hendel, 1925
Amblada Walker 1860
Arnomyia Malloch, 1925
Asilostoma Hendel, 1925
Aulogastromyia Hendel, 1925
Baliopteridion Papp & Silva, 1995
Calliopum Strand, 1928
Camptoprosopella Hendel, 1907
Cestrotus Loew, 1862 
Choryeuromyia Gaimari & Silva, 2010
Cnemacantha Macquart, 1835
Deceia Malloch, 1923
Deutominettia Hendel, 1925
Elipolambda Gaimari & Silva, 2020
Eurychoromyia Hendel, 1910
Euryhendelimyia Gaimari & Silva, 2010
Eurystratiomyia Gaimari & Silva, 2010
Eusapromyza Malloch, 1923
Exalla Gaimari, 2011
Gauzania Walker, 1856
Gibbolauxania Papp & Silva, 1995
Griphoneura Schiner, 1868
Griphoneuromima Gaimari & Silva, 2020
Hirtodeceia Shewell, 1986
Homoneura Wulp, 1891
Lauxania Latreille, 1804
Luzonomyza Malloch, 1925
Mallochomyza Hendel, 1925
Marmarodeceia Shewell, 1986
Meiosimyza Hendel, 1925
Melanomyza Malloch, 1923
Meraina Gaimari & Silva, 2020
Minettia Robineau-Desvoidy, 1830
Minilauxania Papp & Silva, 1995
Mycterella Kertész, 1912
Myzaprosa Gaimari & Silva, 2020
Neodeceia Malloch, 1924
Neogeomyza Séguy, 1938
Neogriphoneura Malloch, 1924
Neoparoecus Özdikmen & Merz, 2006
Oncodometopus Shewell, 1986
Pachycerina Macquart, 1835
Pachyopella Shewell, 1986
Paradeceia Gaimari & Silva, 2020
Paranomina Hendel, 1907
Parapachycerina Stuckenberg, 1971
Peplominettia Szilády, 1943
Peplomyza Haliday, 1837
Physegeniopsis Gaimari & Silva, 2010
Physegenua Macquart, 1848
Physoclypeus Hendel, 1907
Poecilolycia Shewell, 1986
Poecilominettia Hendel, 1932
Prosopomyia Loew, 1856
Pseudocalliope Malloch, 1928
Pseudodeceia Gaimari & Silva, 2020
Pseudominettia Papp & Silva, 1995
Roryeuchomyia Gaimari & Silva, 2010
Sapromyza Fallén, 1810
Sapromyzosoma Lioy, 1864
Sciasminettia Shewell, 1986
Sericominettia Gaimari & Silva, 2020
Steganolauxania Frey, 1918
Stenolauxania Malloch, 1926 
Tauridion Papp & Silva, 1995
Tricholauxania Hendel, 1925
Trigonometopus Macquart, 1835
Trisapromyza Shewell, 1986
Trivialia Malloch, 1923
Trypetisoma Malloch, 1924
Wawu Evenhuis 1989
Xangelina Walker 1856
Xeniconeura Shewell, 1986
Xenochaetina Malloch, 1923
Xenopterella Malloch, 1926
Zamyprosa Gaimari & Silva, 2020
Zargopsinettia Gaimari & Silva, 2020

Gallery

References

Further reading
Evenhuis, N.L., and T. Okadome. 1989. Family Lauxaniidae, pp 576–589. In Evenhuis, N.L. (ed.), Catalog of the Diptera of the Australasian and Oceanian Regions. E.J. Brill, Leiden. 1155 pp.

Identification
 Czerny. 1932. Lauxaniidae.In: Lindner, E. (Ed.). Die Fliegen der Paläarktischen Region  , 5, 50, 1-76. Keys to Palaearctic species but now needs revision (in German).
Papp, L. 1978a Contribution to the revision of Palaearctic Lauxaniidae (Diptera). Annales historico naturales Musei nationalis Hungarici 70: 213-231. 
Papp, L. 1984. Lauxaniidae (Diptera), new Palaearctic species and taxonomic notes. Acta Zoologica Hungarica 30: 157-179.
Papp, L. & Shatalkin, A.I., 1998 Family Lauxaniidae. In: Papp, L. & Darvas, B. (Eds.), Contributions to a Manual of Palaearctic Diptera. Volume 3, Higher Brachycera. Science Herald Publishers, Budapest, pp. 383–400 
Séguy, E. (1934) Diptères: Brachycères. II. Muscidae acalypterae, Scatophagidae. Paris: Éditions Faune de France 28. virtuelle numérique
Shatalkin, A.I. 2000. Keys to the Palaearctic flies of the family Lauxaniidae (Diptera). Zoologicheskie Issledovania 5: 1-102.
Shtakel'berg, A.A. Family Lauxaniidae in  Bei-Bienko, G. Ya, 1988 Keys to the insects of the European Part of the USSR Volume 5 (Diptera) Part 2 English edition.Keys to Palaearctic species but now needs revision .

Species lists
Palaearctic
Australasian/Oceanian
Nearctic
Japan
World species

External links

Family Lauxaniidae at EOL image gallery
Diptera.info image gallery
BugGuide image gallery
Lauxaniidae of Fiji Many images of types.
Family descriptions
Wing venation

 
Brachycera families
Articles containing video clips
Taxa named by Pierre-Justin-Marie Macquart